Polium or Polion was a town of ancient Lesbos.

The site of Polium is unlocated, but may be near modern Poli; no evidence of an ancient settlement have been uncovered.

References

Populated places in the ancient Aegean islands
Former populated places in Greece
Ancient Lesbos